Mohave County is in the northwestern corner of the U.S. state of Arizona. As of the 2020 census, its population was 213,267. The county seat is Kingman, and the largest city is Lake Havasu City. It is the fifth largest county in the United States (by area).

Mohave County includes the Lake Havasu City–Kingman, Arizona Metropolitan Statistical Area, which is also included in the Las Vegas-Henderson, Nevada-Arizona Combined Statistical Area.

Mohave County contains parts of Grand Canyon National Park and Lake Mead National Recreation Area and all of the Grand Canyon–Parashant National Monument. The Kaibab, Fort Mojave and Hualapai Indian Reservations also lie within the county.

History
Mohave County was the one of four original Arizona Counties created by the 1st Arizona Territorial Legislature. The county territory was originally defined as being west of longitude 113° 20' and north of the Bill Williams River. Pah-Ute County was created from it in 1865 and was merged back into Mohave County in 1871 when much of its territory was ceded to Nevada in 1866. The county's present boundaries were established in 1881.  The county is also notable for being home to a large polygamous Fundamentalist Church of Jesus Christ of Latter-Day Saints sect located in Colorado City.

Mohave County has had five county seats: Mohave City (1864–1867), Hardyville (1867–1873), Cerbat (1873–1877), Mineral Park (1877–1887), and Kingman (1887–present).

Geography
It is the second-largest county by area in Arizona and the fifth-largest in the contiguous United States.

The county consists of two sections divided by the Grand Canyon, with no direct land communication between them. The northern section, smaller and less populated, forms the western part of the Arizona Strip, bordering Utah and Nevada. The larger southern section borders Nevada and California across the Colorado River, which forms most of the county's western boundary. The southern section includes Kingman, the county seat, and other cities, as well as part of the Mojave Desert.

Adjacent counties
 Washington County, Utah – north
 Kane County, Utah – northeast
 Coconino County – east
 Yavapai County – east
 La Paz County – south
 San Bernardino County, California – southwest
 Clark County, Nevada – west
 Lincoln County, Nevada – northwest

Mohave County and its adjacent counties form the largest such block of counties outside of Alaska. They include the #1 (San Bernardino), #2 (Coconino), #5 (Mohave), and #7 (Lincoln) largest counties outside of Alaska. If Nye County, Nevada- which is #3 for total county area that does not border Mohave but borders neighboring Lincoln and Clark counties is included, then the combined land area would be 107,726.34 squard miles or larger than  the state of Colorado.

National protected areas
 Bill Williams River National Wildlife Refuge (part)
 Grand Canyon National Park (part)
 Grand Canyon–Parashant National Monument
 Havasu National Wildlife Refuge (part)
 Kaibab National Forest (part)
 Lake Mead National Recreation Area (part)
 Pipe Spring National Monument

There are 18 official wilderness areas in Mohave County that are part of the National Wilderness Preservation System. Most of these are managed by the Bureau of Land Management, but some are integral parts of the preceding protected areas, or have shared jurisdiction with the BLM. Some extend into neighboring counties (as indicated below) All wilderness areas within Grand Canyon–Parashant National Monument are managed by BLM, although the National Monument shares management with the National Park Service:
 Arrastra Mountain Wilderness (BLM) partly in Yavapai County, Arizona, and La Paz County, Arizona
 Aubrey Peak Wilderness (BLM)
 Beaver Dam Mountains Wilderness (BLM) partly in Washington County, Utah
 Cottonwood Point Wilderness (BLM)
 Grand Wash Cliffs Wilderness (Grand Canyon–Parashant NM) managed by BLM
 Havasu Wilderness (Havasu NWR) partly in San Bernardino County, California
 Kanab Creek Wilderness (Kaibab NF / BLM) mostly in Coconino County, Arizona
 Mount Logan Wilderness (Grand Canyon–Parashant NM) managed by BLM
 Mount Nutt Wilderness (BLM)
 Mount Tipton Wilderness (BLM)
 Mount Trumbull Wilderness (Grand Canyon–Parashant NM) managed by BLM
 Mount Wilson Wilderness (BLM)
 Paiute Wilderness (partly in Grand Canyon–Parashant NM) managed by BLM
 Rawhide Mountains Wilderness (BLM) mostly in La Paz County, Arizona
 Swansea Wilderness (BLM) mostly in La Paz County, Arizona
 Upper Burro Creek Wilderness (BLM) mostly in Yavapai County, Arizona
 Wabayuma Peak Wilderness (BLM)
 Warm Springs Wilderness (BLM)

Demographics

2000 census
As of the census of 2000, there were 155,032 people, 62,809 households, and 43,401 families living in the county.  The population density was 12 people per square mile (4/km2).  There were 80,062 housing units at an average density of 6 per square mile (2/km2).  The racial makeup of the county was 90.1% White, 0.5% Black or African American, 2.4% Native American, 0.8% Asian, 0.1% Pacific Islander, 4.0% from other races, and 2.1% from two or more races.  11.1% of the population were Hispanic or Latino of any race.

There were 62,809 households, out of which 25.1% had children under the age of 18 living with them, 55.1% were married couples living together, 9.3% had a female householder with no husband present, and 30.9% were non-families. 24.1% of all households were made up of individuals, and 11.3% had someone living alone who was 65 years of age or older.  The average household size was 2.45 and the average family size was 2.87.

In the county, the population was spread out, with 23.1% under the age of 18, 6.5% from 18 to 24, 23.2% from 25 to 44, 26.7% from 45 to 64, and 20.5% who were 65 years of age or older.  The median age was 43 years. For every 100 females there were 98.90 males.  For every 100 females age 18 and over, there were 96.80 males.

The median income for a household in the county was $31,521, and the median income for a family was $36,311. Males had a median income of $28,505 versus $20,632 for females. The per capita income for the county was $16,788.  About 9.8% of families and 13.9% of the population were below the poverty line, including 20.4% of those under age 18 and 7.7% of those age 65 or over.

2010 census
As of the census of 2010, there were 200,186 people, 82,539 households, and 54,036 families living in the county. The racial makeup of the county was 86.9% white, 2.2% American Indian, 1.1% Asian, 0.9% black or African American, 0.2% Pacific islander, 6.0% from other races, and 2.7% from two or more races. Those of Hispanic or Latino origin made up 14.8% of the population. In terms of ancestry, 23.1% were German, 16.2% were Irish, 15.6% were English, 5.7% were Italian, and 4.5% were American.

Of the 82,539 households, 24.5% had children under the age of 18 living with them, 49.5% were married couples living together, 10.4% had a female householder with no husband present, 34.5% were non-families, and 26.7% of all households were made up of individuals. The average household size was 2.39 and the average family size was 2.86. The median age was 47.6 years.

The median income for a household in the county was $39,785 and the median income for a family was $47,530. Males had a median income of $36,222 versus $28,060 for females. The per capita income for the county was $21,523. About 11.6% of families and 16.1% of the population were below the poverty line, including 24.7% of those under age 18 and 7.0% of those age 65 or over.

Politics, government, and infrastructure
Since 2008, Mohave has taken over from Graham and Yavapai as the “reddest” county in the state, and in 2016 it stood as such by twenty percentage points. No Democratic presidential nominee has carried Mohave County since Lyndon Johnson, who, despite the home state advantage of Arizona native Barry Goldwater, did so in 1964, by a margin of only 152 votes. (In the 1990s, Bill Clinton came very close to winning this county, if not because of a combination of significant nationwide rural appeal and third-party candidate Ross Perot's Western appeal himself.)

In recent elections it has become common for Democratic nominees to receive less than thirty percent of the county's vote, and Hillary Clinton in 2016 received less than 22 percent. In 2020 Donald Trump received nearly 75% of the vote in Mohave County.

The Mohave County Administration Building is located in downtown Kingman at 700 West Beale Street. The old County Complex, which the Administration Building replaced, was located adjacent to the courthouse on Spring Street and 4th Street. The Mohave County Superior Courthouse, built in 1915, is an Art Deco/Streamline Moderne building on the National Register of Historic Places. The county jail is adjacent to the County Administration Building at 501 S. Highway 66.

Arizona State Prison – Kingman, a privately run prison of the Arizona Department of Corrections, is located in unincorporated Mohave County near Golden Valley and Kingman.

Education

K-12 school districts
The following school districts serve Mohave County:

Unified school districts
 Colorado City Unified School District
 Fredonia-Moccasin Unified District
 Kingman Unified School District
 Lake Havasu Unified School District
 Littlefield Unified School District
 Peach Springs Unified School District – While it is a USD, it sends its high school students to other districts

High school districts
 Colorado River Union High School District

Elementary school districts
 Bullhead City Elementary School District
 Hackberry School District
 Mohave Valley Elementary School District
 Owens-Whitney Elementary School District
 Topock Elementary School District
 Valentine Elementary School District
 Yucca Elementary School District

Additionally there is a charter school:
 Kingman Academy of Learning

Colleges
 Mohave Community College
 Arizona State University Lake Havasu City Campus

Public libraries
The Mohave County Library has ten branches.  The branches in Bullhead City, Kingman and Lake Havasu City are open 56 hours a week.  The branch in Mohave Valley is open 40 hours a week.  Branches in Chloride, Dolan Springs, Golden Shores, Golden Valley, Meadview and Valle Vista are open 15 hours a week.

Transportation

Major highways

  Interstate 15
  Interstate 40
  Historic U.S. Route 66
  U.S. Route 93
  State Route 66
  State Route 68
  State Route 95
  State Route 389

Airports
The following public use airports are located in Mohave County:
 Bullhead City – Eagle Airpark (A09)
 Bullhead City – Laughlin-Bullhead International Airport (IFP)
 Bullhead City – Sun Valley Airport (A20)
 Colorado City – Colorado City Municipal Airport (AZC)
 Kingman – Kingman Airport (IGM)
 Lake Havasu City – Lake Havasu City Airport (HII)
 Meadview – Pearce Ferry Airport (L25)
 Peach Springs – Grand Canyon West Airport (1G4)
 Temple Bar – Temple Bar Airport (U30)

Communities

Cities
 Bullhead City
 Kingman (county seat)
 Lake Havasu City

Town
 Colorado City

Census-designated places

 Antares
 Arizona Village
 Beaver Dam
 Cane Beds
 Centennial Park
 Chloride
 Clacks Canyon
 Crozier
 Crystal Beach
 Desert Hills
 Dolan Springs
 Fort Mohave
 Golden Shores
 Golden Valley
 Grand Canyon West
 Hackberry
 Kaibab
 Katherine
 Lazy Y U
 Littlefield
 McConnico
 Meadview
 Mesquite Creek
 Moccasin
 Mohave Valley
 Mojave Ranch Estates
 New Kingman-Butler
 Oatman
 Peach Springs
 Pine Lake
 Pinion Pines
 Scenic
 So-Hi
 Topock
 Truxton
 Valentine
 Valle Vista
 Walnut Creek
 White Hills
 Wikieup
 Willow Valley
 Yucca

Ghost towns

 Alamo Crossing
 Aubrey Landing
 Camp Beale Springs
 Cedar
 Cerbat
 Cottonia
 Cyclopic
 Fort Mohave
 Frisco
 Germa
 Golconda
 Gold Basin
 Goldflat
 Goldroad
 Grand Gulch
 Grasshopper Junction
 Greenwood City
 Hardyville
 Henning
 Lincolnia
 Liverpool Landing
 Lost Basin
 Macnab
 McCracken
 Mellen
 Mineral City
 Mineral Park
 Mockingbird
 Mohave City
 Mount Trumbull
 Nothing
 Old Trails
 Pearce Ferry
 Polhamus Landing
 Powell
 Pyramid
 Sandy
 Santa Claus
 Signal
 Snowball
 Stockton
 Tuweep
 Virginia City
 Vivian
 Willow Ranch
 Wolf Hole

Indian communities
 Fort Mojave Indian Reservation
 Kaibab Indian Reservation
 Hualapai Indian Reservation

County population ranking
The population ranking of the following table is based on the 2010 census of Mohave County.

† county seat

Economy

Mining
Artillery Peak mine

See also
 National Register of Historic Places listings in Mohave County, Arizona
 Upper Burro Creek Wilderness

References

External links

 
 Mohave County Government
 Mohave County Political Information
 

 
Arizona placenames of Native American origin
1864 establishments in Arizona Territory
Populated places established in 1864
Ghost towns in Arizona